WSPL (1250 AM) is an American radio station licensed to serve the community of Streator, Illinois. The station is owned by Studstill Media and the broadcast license is held by Mendota Broadcasting, Inc.

The station, established in 1953 as "WIZZ", was assigned the call sign "WSPL" by the Federal Communications Commission (FCC) on January 5, 2001.

Programming

WSPL airs an adult standards format. WSPL previously broadcast a news/talk radio format. Local programming on WSPL includes a morning drive show, and sports with Illinois Hall of Fame Broadcaster "Big Al" Hauessler, along with a tradio show called The Swap Shop. Sports broadcasts include Streator Township High School football and, up until recently, simulcasts of Chicago White Sox baseball and Chicago Bulls basketball.

On January 24, 2023, it was announced that Studstill Media had sold WSPL, along with its sister stations, to Shaw Media in Crystal Lake, Illinois, for a total of $1.8 million. The sale is presently under FCC review with anticipation of being completed later in the year.

Alumni
"Cousin Ed" Nowotarski hosted "Polka Party", a live polka music program, on WSPL for 34 years before retiring from broadcasting in November 2001. Nowotarski died in January 2004.

References

External links
WSPL official website

SPL
Adult standards radio stations in the United States
Full service radio stations in the United States
Radio stations established in 1953
LaSalle County, Illinois
1953 establishments in Illinois